Hvidovre Badminton Club (HBC), also known as Hvidovre BK (Hvidovre Badmintonklub), is a badminton club in Hvidovre in the western suburbs of Copenhagen, Denmark. It has won the Danish Badminton League three times and Europe Cup twice.

History
The Hvidovre Badmintonklub was founded as Holmegårdens Badminton Club on 22 April 1948. It was then part of Holmegårdens Gymnastikforening and used the gymnastics hall at Holmegårdskolen in the northern part of Hvidovre. The number of members grew steadily and the club changed its name to Hvidovre Badmintonklub (Hvidovre BK) on 4 March 1960. The club won the Danish Badminton League for the first time in 1980.

Notable players
 Jesper Helledie
 Morten Bokelund Two times champion in men's double at Hvidovre - SEN A 2018-2019

Location
The club is based in HBC Hallen on Bibliotekvej 62 in Hvidovre.

Achievements

Europe Cup
Champion: 1997, 2001
Runner-Up: 1980

Danish Badminton League
Champion: 1979–80, 2000–01, 2005-2006

References

External links
 Official website

Badminton clubs in Copenhagen
Hvidovre Municipality
Sports clubs established in 1948
1948 establishments in Denmark